The 2017–18 All-Ireland Intermediate Club Hurling Championship was the 14th staging of the All-Ireland Intermediate Club Hurling Championship, the Gaelic Athletic Association's intermediate inter-county club hurling tournament. The championship began on 1 October 2017 and ended on 4 February 2018.

On 4 February 2018, Kanturk won the championship following a 1–18 to 1–17 defeat of St. Patrick's Ballyragget in the All-Ireland final. This was their first All-Ireland title in the grade.

Results

Connacht Intermediate Club Hurling Championship

Semi-final

Final

Leinster Intermediate Club Hurling Championship

Quarter-finals

Semi-finals

Final

Munster Intermediate Club Hurling Championship

Quarter-finals

Semi-finals

Final

Ulster Intermediate Club Hurling Championship

Quarter-finals

Semi-finals

Final

All-Ireland Intermediate Club Hurling Championship

Quarter-final

Semi-finals

Final

Championship statistics

Miscellaneous

 Glenealy become the first club from Wicklow to qualify for a Leinster final in any grade of hurling.
 The All-Ireland semi-final between Kanturk and Middletown Na Fianna, originally scheduled for 21 January, was postponed due to adverse weather conditions.

External links
 All-Ireland Intermediate Club Hurling Championship fixtures

References

All-Ireland Intermediate Club Hurling Championship
All-Ireland Intermediate Club Hurling Championship
2017